August C. Schlosser (born October 20, 1988) is an American former professional baseball pitcher. He has played for the Atlanta Braves of Major League Baseball.

Professional career

Atlanta Braves
Schlosser was drafted by the Atlanta Braves in the 17th round of the 2011 Major League Baseball Draft out of  Florida Southern College. In 2013, he pitched for the Double—A Mississippi Braves and finished with a 2.39 earned run average.

Invited to spring training by the Braves in 2014, Schlosser competed for a bullpen spot on the Braves opening day roster. On March 29, it was announced that he had made the team. He made his major league debut against the Milwaukee Brewers on March 31, throwing 14 pitches to four batters. He was sent to the minors in July.

Schlosser became a free agent on December 2, 2014 after he was non-tendered by the Braves. The Braves then signed Schlosser to a minor league contract.

Colorado Rockies
On January 30, 2015, the Braves traded Schlosser and David Hale to the Colorado Rockies for minor league catchers José Briceño and Chris O'Dowd. Schlosser was released by the Rockies on July 31, 2015.

Somerset Patriots
He signed with the Somerset Patriots of the Atlantic League of Professional Baseball on August 9, 2015.

Los Angeles Dodgers
On May 31, 2016, The Los Angeles Dodgers signed Schlosser to a minor league contract. He appeared in 14 games for AA Tulsa and 12 games for AAA Oklahoma City with a combined 5.48 ERA.

References

External links

1988 births
Living people
Sportspeople from Sarasota, Florida
Baseball players from Florida
Major League Baseball pitchers
Atlanta Braves players
Florida Southern Moccasins baseball players
Danville Braves players
Rome Braves players
Lynchburg Hillcats players
Mississippi Braves players
Gwinnett Braves players
New Britain Rock Cats players
Somerset Patriots players
Oklahoma City Dodgers players
Tulsa Drillers players